Homesick is a 1928 American comedy film directed by Henry Lehrman and written by John Stone and William Kernell. The film stars Sammy Cohen, Harry Sweet, Marjorie Beebe, Henry Armetta, and Pat Harmon. The film was released on December 16, 1928, by Fox Film Corporation.

Cast      
Sammy Cohen as Sammy Schnable
Harry Sweet as Ambrose
Marjorie Beebe as Babe
Henry Armetta as Bicycle Rider
Pat Harmon as Polish Bicycle Rider

References

External links
 

1928 films
1920s English-language films
Silent American comedy films
1928 comedy films
Fox Film films
Films directed by Henry Lehrman
American silent feature films
American black-and-white films
1920s American films